Clusiodes johnsoni is a species of fly in the family Clusiidae.

References

External links

 

Clusiidae
Articles created by Qbugbot
Insects described in 1922